General Gill may refer to:

Clair F. Gill (born 1943), U.S. Army major general
Ian Gordon Gill (1919–2006), British Army major general
Inderjit Singh Gill (1922–2001), Indian Army lieutenant general
William H. Gill (1886–1976), U.S. Army major general

See also
Juan José Nieto Gil (1804–1866), Colombian Army general 
Herbert Gille (1897–1966), German SS general